The Plains Apache language (or Kiowa Apache language) was a Southern Athabaskan language formerly spoken by the Plains Apache, organized as the Apache Tribe of Oklahoma, living primarily around Anadarko in southwest Oklahoma. The language is extinct as of 2008, when Alfred Chalepah, Jr., the last native speaker, died.

Plains Apache is the most divergent member of the Southern Athabaskan languages, a family which also includes Navajo, Chiricahua Apache, Mescalero Apache, Lipan Apache, Western Apache, and Jicarilla Apache. As a member of the broader Athabaskan family, it has an extremely complex system of verbal morphology, often enabling entire sentences to be constructed with only a verb.

Phonology
This article follows the orthography of Bittle (1963); where this differs from the IPA, IPA is given between slashes.

Consonants
Plains Apache has a large consonant inventory resembling that of its close relatives Navajo and Western Apache.

The phoneme  is only found in prefixes and does not occur before .  is in free variation with  preceding  and also does not occur before .

Vowels
Plains Apache distinguishes four vowel qualities, much like the other Southern Athabaskan languages.

Additionally, all vowels may be either short or long and nasal or oral. Length is indicated in the orthography by writing the vowel twice (e.g. , 'water'); nasalization is indicated with an ogonek (e.g. , 'earth').

Syllable Structure
The Plains Apache syllable is maximally CCV:C, e.g.  'pants', though initial clusters are rare and must co-occur with a long vowel, making most syllables (C)V(:)(C), e.g.  'cactus' and  'dust'. All consonants may appear in the syllable onset, although  and a null onset are not permitted word-initially; only  and  may appear in the syllable coda, whether word-final or not.

Tone 
Plains Apache has a register tone system with two levels, low and high. Low is written with a grave accent (e.g. , 'bank'), and high is written with an acute accent (e.g. , 'kindness'). Syllables with short vowels bear a single toneme, but those with long vowels have one toneme for each mora of the vowel, making for a total of four contours:

 high-high, 'bark'
 high-low, 'point'
 low-high, 'snake'
 low-low, 'spread of cedars'

Morphology

Nouns 
Almost every noun in Plains Apache can optionally take a pronominal prefix to indicate its possessor. These prefixes are as follows (some of the prefixes have multiple forms in free variation; in these cases, the more common variant is listed first).

Some of these forms require further explanation. The indefinite third person may be used when the possessor is unknown, and is similar in meaning to 'someone's' (e.g. , 'a hoop owned by some unknown person').

The noun bases to which these prefixes can be added are of one of three classes: primary, compound, and nominalized. , 'antelope'), and some others are simply unanalyzable polysyllables, perhaps originally onomatopoeic (e.g. , 'magpie'). Many of the stem nouns have different forms depending on their morphological context, with an absolute form when unpossessed, an inflected form when possessed, and a combining form in compounds or nominalized phrases.

Some stem nouns, especially those referring to body parts, are inalienably possessed, i.e. they cannot occur without a possessor prefix (e.g. , 'his lips', but not ). In these cases the indefinite prefix must be used if one wishes to talk about the object without specifying the possessor ('lips'). , 'enemy', but , 'his enemy', not *).

The second kind of noun bases are compounds, which are formed from two noun stems and sometimes an enclitic of obscure meaning (e.g. The third kind of noun bases are nominalized verbs or phrases, which may or may not include some kind of a relative enclitic.

Verbs 
Like those of most other Athabaskan languages, Plains Apache verbs are highly morphologically complex, exhibiting polypersonal agreement, rich aspect marking, and the characteristic Athabaskan classifier system (a set of four mandatory valence-changing prefixes found throughout the family). Bittle (1963) identifies 14 positions in the verb template, divided into the verbal base (which defines the lexical meaning of the verb) and paradigmatic prefixes (which inflect the verb for person, number, tense, aspect, mood, and voice). The following verb template table is reproduced from Bittle:

3SBJ:3rd person (singular), subject
3OBJ:3rd person (singular), object
However, a verb in Plains Apache never has an affix in each position. A typical verb might be inflected as follows:

All other slots are empty.

The above example displays the zero classifier. Following is an example of a fully inflected verb with the  classifier prefix:

Syntax 

Like other Southern Athabaskan languages, Plains Apache has strongly head-final tendencies, with a predominant word order of subject-object-verb and postpositions rather than prepositions. This is illustrated in the following example sentences:

However, due to the morphological complexity of Plains Apache verb inflection, it is often possible for a sentence to consist of a single verb, e.g.

Noun phrases always contain only a noun, as Plains Apache has no determiners or adjectives; the equivalent of adjectival modification is achieved by the use of compound and nominalized nouns discussed above.

See also
 Apache
 Southern Athabaskan languages
 Kiowa

Notes

References

 Bittle, William E. (n.d.). Plains Apache field notes.  (Unpublished manuscript).
 Bittle, William E. (1956). The position of Kiowa-Apache in the Apachean group. (Doctoral dissertation, University of California, Los Angeles).
 Bittle, William E. (1963). Kiowa-Apache.  In H. Hoijer (Ed.), Studies in the Athapaskan languages (pp. 76–101). University of California publications in linguistics (No. 29). Berkeley: University of California Press.
 Bittle, William E. (1967). Kiowa-Apache. In H. Hoijer (Ed.), Studies in Southwestern ethnolinguistics: meaning and history in the languages of the American Southwest. Berkeley: University of California Press.
 Bittle, William E. (1971). A brief history of the Kiowa-Apache. Oklahoma Papers in Anthropology 12(1): 1-34.
 Bittle, William E. (1979). Kiowa Apache Raiding Behavior. Oklahoma Papers in Anthropology 20(2): 33-47.
 Collins, Melanie Ruth. (1983). Plains Apache: Strength Relations Among the Phonological Elements in a Dying Language. MA thesis, University of Oklahoma.
 Gatschet, Albert S. (1884). Na-isha Band, Apache (Kiowa Apache). Vocabulary and brief texts with interlinear translation November - December, 1884. Manuscript 62, National Anthropological Archives, Smithsonian Institution. Washington, DC.
 Goddard, Pliny Earle. (1911). Field notes in California Athabascan languages. American Council of Learned Societies Committee on Native American Languages, American Philosophical Society. Philadelphia, PA.
 Hoijer, Harry. (1971). The Position of the Apachean Languages in the Athapaskan Stock. Apachean Culture History and Ethnology, ed. by Keith H. Basso and Morris E. Opler. Anthropological Papers of the University of Arizona 21.3-6.
Morgan, J. L. (2012). Classificatory Verbs in Plains Apache (Doctoral dissertation, University of Oklahoma).

Indigenous languages of the North American Plains
Indigenous languages of Oklahoma
Southern Athabaskan languages
Apache culture
Endangered Dené–Yeniseian languages
Extinct languages of North America
Languages extinct in the 2000s